Glen Iris is a suburb in Melbourne, Victoria, Australia,  south-east of Melbourne's Central Business District, located within the Cities of Boroondara and Stonnington local government areas. Glen Iris recorded a population of 26,131 at the 2021 census.

Glen Iris has been Melbourne's geographical centre of population since the 1990s.

History

Captain Thomas Henderson, of the Royal Navy, arrived in Melbourne on a ship called Iris in 1850. He acquired a property bounded by Gardiners Creek, High Street and a line extending Summerhill Road to Gardiners Creek. The property was advertised for sale as Glen Iris, in 1852. Robert Kent, a subsequent owner of the Glen Iris homestead, suggested a Mechanics' Institute be established, but it was never completed. A Wesleyan church was established in 1865 and in 1871 land was granted for an adjacent school (now Glen Iris Primary School). By the 1880s reference was made to the Township of Glen Iris. Glen Iris Post Office opened on 28 August 1890. A Glen Iris Upper Post Office was open from 1947 until 1994.

Places of interest

A number of government and independent schools are located in Glen Iris, including Camberwell South Primary School, Glen Iris Primary School, St Cecilia's Primary School, St Roch's Catholic Primary School, Sacré Cœur School, Korowa Anglican Girls' School and Caulfield Grammar School Malvern campus (the latter three are all situated within a few blocks of one another, south of High Street and east of Burke Road).

Recreational and sporting facilities include the Harold Holt Swim Centre, a BMX track at Hill'n'Dale Park, Burwood District Bowls Club and a number of reserves and ovals, including Hartwell Sports Ground, Ferndale Park and T.H. King Oval. The Glen Iris wetlands were established by the former City of Malvern in 1989.

Glen Iris Road Uniting Church incorporates part of the original 1865 Wesleyan Church building.

The division between the Boroondara and Stonnington municipalities follows the course of Gardiners Creek, which is a tributary of the Yarra River. A tributary of Gardiners Creek, running north through the suburb, Back Creek, has largely been turned into a drain. Also roughly following the course of Gardiners Creek is the Monash Freeway, and the Glen Waverley train line.

The Harold Holt Memorial Swimming Centre was built in memory of former Prime Minister Harold Holt whose electoral seat was Higgins and included Glen Iris. This pool has led to the amusement of many locals and visitors as they realise a pool was built to commemorate a man who was presumed drowned after going missing, at Cheviot Beach, Portsea in 1967.

Transport

Two train stations on the Glen Waverley railway line, Gardiner and Glen Iris, are within the suburb. Passing through the eastern part of Glen Iris is the Alamein line, with Burwood Station also within the boundaries of the suburb (Glen Iris did not originally cover this far east, and this station and its surrounds were originally in the suburb of Burwood). Residents are also served by the numbers 5, 6, 72 and 75 tram routes. Melbourne bus routes also service the area.

Notable residents

 Mathematician Sir Thomas MacFarland Cherry.
 Eva Duldig (born 1938) - Austrian-born Australian and Dutch tennis player, author
 Herbert Feith – academic and world leading scholar of Indonesian politics.
 Mack Horton - swimmer
 George Johnston – author of the Miles Franklin Award winning novel My Brother Jack. Johnston and his first wife rented in Britten Street, Glen Iris, for a brief period in 1938–39.
 Colin McDonald – born 1928 in Glen Iris, is an Australian cricketer, who played in 47 Tests from 1952 to 1961.
 Ross Ryan – singer-songwriter and producer.
 Private Greg Sher – killed in action in Afghanistan on 4 January 2009 and subject of honorary garden and plaque at Ferndale Park.
 Glen Iris was also the home of Australian comedian and satirist Barry Humphries' fictional character Sandy Stone.
 Matthew Wales – resident of Glen Iris, who was convicted of the murders of Margaret Wales-King and Paul King in 2003, in what became known as the Society Murders.
 Gerard Whateley - sports broadcaster

Sister cities
 Glendale, United States

See also
 City of Camberwell, City of Hawthorn, City of Malvern – Glen Iris was previously within these former local government areas.

References

Suburbs of Melbourne
Suburbs of the City of Stonnington
Suburbs of the City of Boroondara